The Legend of Bloody Mary is a 2008 American horror-thriller film written by John Stecenko and Dominick R. Domingo, directed by Stecenko and starring Paul Preiss, Nicole Aiken and Caitlin Wachs. The film has an R rating for its violence, language and sexuality/nudity.

Plot

Ryan (played by Paul Preiss) has been plagued by nightmares since his sister Amy (Rachel Taylor) disappeared after playing the game "Bloody Mary" eight years earlier. Ryan, now a senior at college, suffers from stress and guilt from his sister's disappearance. His girlfriend Rachel (Irina Costa) calls for the help of Father O'Neal (Robert J. Locke), a former professor of Ryan. O'Neal, a priest and an archaeologist, tries to help Ryan by attempting to uncover the circumstances on Amy's vanishing.

Cast

Critical reception

The film has received negative reviews. Tom Becker of the DVD Verdict said, "The film is guilty of being a bloody bore. The accused are sentenced to stand in front of a mirror chanting, "I believe in Ed Wood," until they learn that bad movies can be entertaining, too". Eat Horror panned the film stating, "This is a muddled story with plot holes aplenty and terrible acting even by low budget horror standards. The direction is all over the place with too many hand-held shots and the meager effects are cheap and terrible. You would think the Bloody Mary story would eventually spawn a decent horror film but this isn't it". Home Theater Info rated B+ giving 7 out of 10.

See also
Bloody Mary folklore in popular culture

References

External links

2008 films
American horror thriller films
2008 horror films
2000s horror thriller films
2000s ghost films
American ghost films
Films based on urban legends
2000s English-language films
2000s American films